Compositio Mathematica is a monthly peer-reviewed mathematics journal established by L.E.J. Brouwer in 1935. It is owned by the Foundation Compositio Mathematica, and since 2004 it has been published on behalf of the Foundation by the London Mathematical Society in partnership with Cambridge University Press. According to the Journal Citation Reports, the journal has a 2020 2-year impact factor of 1.456 and a 2020 5-year impact factor of 1.696.

The editors-in-chief are Jochen Heinloth, Bruno Klingler, Lenny Taelman, and Éric Vasserot.

Early history 
The journal was established by L. E. J. Brouwer in response to his dismissal from Mathematische Annalen in 1928. An announcement of the new journal was made in a 1934 issue of the American Mathematical Monthly. In 1940 the publication of the journal was suspended due to the German occupation of the Netherlands.

References

External links 
 
 Online archive (1935-1996)

Academic journals associated with learned and professional societies of the United Kingdom
Cambridge University Press academic journals
Bimonthly journals
English-language journals
Mathematics education in the United Kingdom
Mathematics journals
Publications established in 1935
London Mathematical Society